Dora Dueck (born 1950) is a Canadian writer. She is the author of three novels, a collection of short fiction, and a collection of essays and memoir. Her second novel, This Hidden Thing, was shortlisted for the Margaret Laurence Award for Fiction and won the McNally Robinson Book of the Year Award at the 2011 Manitoba Book Awards. What You Get at Home, a collection of short stories, was shortlisted for the Margaret Laurence Award for Fiction and the Carol Shields Winnipeg Award at the 2013 Manitoba Book Awards. It won the High Plains Book Award for Short Stories. The Malahat Review, a Canadian literary magazine, awarded its 2014 Novella Prize to her story "Mask". All That Belongs, her third novel, was published in 2019. Her stories and articles have appeared in a variety of journals and on the CBC.

She holds a Bachelor of Arts degree from the University of Winnipeg and a Master of Arts degree in history from the University of Winnipeg and the University of Manitoba (joint program).

Bibliography
 Under the Still Standing Sun Winnipeg, MB: Kindred Press (1989)
 This Hidden Thing Winnipeg, MB: CMU Press (2010)
 What You Get at Home Winnipeg, MB: Turnstone Press (2012)
 All That Belongs Winnipeg, MB: Turnstone Press (2019)
 Return Stroke: Essays and Memoir Winnipeg, MB: CMU Press (2022)

Awards
 2020 Shortlisted, Carol Shields Winnipeg Books Award - All That Belongs
2014 Winner, The Malahat Review - Novella Prize - Mask
 2013 Winner, High Plains Book Award - Short Stories - What You Get at Home
 2013 Shortlisted, Margaret Laurence Award for Fiction - What You Get at Home
 2013 Shortlisted, Carol Shields Winnipeg Book Award - What You Get at Home
 2011 Shortlisted, Margaret Laurence Award for Fiction - This Hidden Thing
 2011 Winner, McNally Robinson Book of the Year Award - This Hidden Thing
 2000 The Duff Roblin Fellowship, University of Manitoba
 1999 Donald V. Snider Memorial Fellowship, University of Winnipeg

References

20th-century Canadian novelists
21st-century Canadian novelists
Writers from Winnipeg
Living people
1950 births
Canadian women novelists
Canadian women short story writers
20th-century Canadian women writers
21st-century Canadian women writers
Canadian Mennonites
Mennonite writers
21st-century Canadian short story writers
20th-century Canadian short story writers